Remady & Manu-L is a Swiss deep house duo consisting of Manu-L (born: Emanuel Gut) and Remady (born: Marc Würgler; 12 December 1977).

Career

Members 
Manu-L (born: Emanuel Gut), formed a pop duo called Myron in 2003 as the vocalist and guitarist, together with songwriter, guitarist and bass player Chris Haffner in Basel. The duo signed to Columbia Records of Sony BMG in 2007.

Remady (born: Marc Würgler; 12 December 1977) initially used the name Player & Remady (also known as Remady P&R) before simply using "Remady". He achieved his first commercially successful album No Superstar (The Album) which featured singles "Give Me A Sign", "Save Your Heart", "No Superstar" and "Do It On My Own". "Give Me A Sign" earned him an NRJ award. He has collaborated extensively with Manu-L, prior to forming the duo.

History 
In 2010, they formed the duo Remady & Manu-L. Their song "Single Ladies" featuring J-Son reached number 1 in 2012 in the Swiss Singles chart and was certified double platinum. "Somebody Dance with Me Remady 2013 Mix", reached number 4 and "Holidays" reached number 3 in Switzerland.

Discography

Albums

Singles

References 

Swiss electronic music groups
Swiss house music groups
Swiss musical duos
Musicians from Zürich
Swiss DJs
Deep house musicians
Electronic dance music duos
Year of birth missing (living people)
Living people